Bhutacha Bhau is a 1989 Indian Marathi-language drama film directed by Sachin Pilgaonkar and produced by Shailendra Singh. The film stars Ashok Saraf, Sachin Pilgaonkar,  Varsha Usgaonkar, Jayram Kulkarni and Laxmikant Berde in lead roles. It was theatrically released on 21 March 1989.

Plot 
Bandu is killed by three goons Appaji, Indrasen and Dayaram then becomes his ghost. He travels to find his long lost brother and mother. His younger brother Nandu is a timid person. Bandu meets him and tells him how these goons killed him and asks him to come to the village. Bandu's spirit is visible only to Nandu. Bandu's spirit enters Nandu's body several times and together they fight these goons.

Cast

Lead cast
 Ashok Saraf as Bandu.
 Sachin Pilgaonkar as Nandu/Nandkumar
 Varsha Usgaonkar as "Anju" Anjali
 Jayram Kulkarni as Rao Saheb
 Bharati Acharekar as Nandu's mother
 Sudhir Joshi as Appaji
 Viju Khote as Indrasen Angre
 Anant Jog as Dayaram Sonawane.
 Laxmikant Berde as Barko
 Rekha Rao as Bitti
 Johnny Lever as Gappaji

Supporting cast
Satish Tungare
Mohan Mungi
Avinash Thakur 
Kanchan Nayak
 Vijay Patkar as Ward boy
 Bipin Varti as Tony
Madhav Mokashi
Suresh Rane 
Avinash Thakur as Inspector
 Madhu Apte as Traffic Hawaldaar 
 Maya Jadhav as Lavani performer

Production 

This film is directed by Sachin Pilgaonkar. The film was shot at Seth Studios, Rajkamal Kalamandir, Essel Studios and Film City, Mumbai. Action sequences was directed by Veeru Devagan. The sets was made by art director R.Varman and dubbing work was done at Ketnav Evershine Studio.

Soundtrack  

Music and background is given by Arun Paudwal. The songs of this film written by Shantaram Naandgaonkar and Pravin Danve and recorded by Aasha Bhosle, Shailendra Singh, Anuradha Paudwal, Suresh Wadkar, Kavita Krushnamurti and Sachin Pilgaonkar.

References

External links 

  
 Bhutacha Bhau at Rotten Tomatoes

1989 films
1980s Marathi-language films
Indian comedy films
Indian comedy thriller films
Indian comedy-drama films